Stan Burns (September 4, 1923 - November 5, 2002) was an American screenwriter. He was the partner of Mike Marmer. Burns wrote for television programs including The Steve Allen Show, The Tonight Show, Get Smart, The Carol Burnett Show, F Troop, Gilligan's Island and The Smothers Brothers Comedy Hour.

Burns won and was nominated for Primetime Emmy Awards from 1959 to 1973. He died in November 2002 of heart failure at the Motion Picture & Television Fund cottages in Woodland Hills, California, at the age of 79.

References

External links 

1923 births
2002 deaths
People from Brooklyn
American screenwriters
American television writers
American male screenwriters
American male television writers
20th-century American screenwriters